Gertrude Talbot, Countess of Shrewsbury (c. 1525 – January 1567), formerly Lady Gertrude Manners, was an English noblewoman of the Elizabethan period.

Gertrude was born in Helmsley Castle, the daughter of Thomas Manners, 1st Earl of Rutland and his wife, the former Eleanor Paston. She married George Talbot on 28 April 1539.

Their children were:
Francis, Lord Talbot (died 1582), who married Anne Herbert, a daughter of the earl of Pembroke, but had no children. "Lord Talbot" was a courtesy title, being one of his father's lesser titles.
Gilbert Talbot, 7th Earl of Shrewsbury, who married Mary Cavendish and had three daughters.
Henry Talbot (1563–1596), who married Elizabeth Rayner and had two daughters.
Edward Talbot, 8th Earl of Shrewsbury (1561-1617), who married Joane Ogle and had no children.
Catherine Talbot (died 1576), who married Henry Herbert, 2nd Earl of Pembroke, and had no children.  
Mary Talbot, who married Sir George Savile, 1st Baronet of Barrowby, Lincolnshire, and had one son
Grace Talbot, who married her step-brother Henry Cavendish (1550–1616), son of Sir William Cavendish of Chatsworth in Derbyshire by his wife Elizabeth Hardwick; they had no children.

The countess died when her children were still young, and was buried in the family vault in Sheffield on 16 January 1567. A few months later, her widower began a courtship of their friend and neighbour, the thrice-widowed Bess of Hardwick, which culminated in their marriage.

References

1530s births
1567 deaths
Daughters of British earls
English countesses
Waterford
Wives of knights